Karagay (Qarağay) is a rural locality (a village) in Uzunlarovsky Selsoviet, Arkhangelsky District, Bashkortostan, Russia. The population was 18 as of 2010. There are two streets.

Geography 
Karagay is located 39 km east of Arkhangelskoye (the district's administrative centre) by road. Azovo is the nearest rural locality.

References 

Rural localities in Arkhangelsky District